Ivan Baranov (born 16 June 1985) is a Ukrainian footballer. He is right and central defender.  Baranov started his career at Ukrainian Premier League club Arsenal Kyiv.

He is a son of former player and coach Oleksandr Baranov.

External links

Baranov at Eurosport

1985 births
Living people
Sportspeople from Makiivka
Ukrainian footballers
Finnish footballers
TP-47 players
FC Arsenal Kyiv players
Association football defenders
FC Viikingit players
IF Gnistan players